Christian Lara may refer to:
 Christian Lara (footballer) (born 1980), Ecuadorian footballer
 Christian Lara (film director) (born 1939), Guadeloupean/French film director, writer, cinematographer and producer